Commerce City Hall is a historic city hall located at Commerce, Scott County, Missouri. It was built about 1896, and is a one-story, one room, frame building measuring 26 feet by 50 feet. It has a hipped roof and sits on a brick and concrete pier foundation.

It was added to the National Register of Historic Places in 2004.

References

Government buildings on the National Register of Historic Places in Missouri
Government buildings completed in 1896
Buildings and structures in Scott County, Missouri
National Register of Historic Places in Scott County, Missouri
City halls in Missouri